This is a list of clubs in Ireland that play Gaelic games categorised by their governing bodies (GAA provincial council and GAA county).

Common abbreviations used in club names are: 
 CC: Camogie Club or Cumann Camogaíochta
 CLG: Cumann Lúthchleas Gael (Gaelic Athletic Club, or Gaelic Athletic Association)
 CPG: Cumann Peile Gaelach (Gaelic Football Club)
 GAA: Gaelic Athletic Association (now often used for individual clubs)
 GAC: Gaelic Athletic Club (often denotes that more than one sport is played)
 GFC: Gaelic Football Club
 HC: Hurling Club or Handball Club
 HCC: Hurling and Camogie Club
 LGFC: Ladies' Gaelic Football Club
 LGFA: Ladies' Gaelic Football Association
 (H): Hurling (F) Football (D) Dual

Connacht

Galway

Defunct Galway Clubs
 St Grellan's (F)
 St Columba's (H)
 St Sourney's (F)
 St Patricks, Coldwood (F)
 St Cuans (H)

Leitrim

Mayo

Roscommon

Sligo

Leinster

Carlow

Dublin

Kildare

Kilkenny

Laois

Longford

Louth

Meath

Offaly

Westmeath

Wexford

Wicklow

Munster

Clare

Cork

Avondhu (North Cork)

 Abbey Rovers
 Araglen
 Awbeg Rangers
 Ballyclough
 Ballygiblin
 Ballyhea
 Ballyhooly
 Buttevant
 Castletownroche
 Charleville
 Clyda Rovers
 Deel Rovers
 Doneraile
 Dromina
 Fermoy
 Glanworth
 Grange
 Harbour Rovers
 Killavullen
 Kildorrery
 Kilshannig
 Kilworth
 Liscarroll Churchtown Gaels
 Mallow
 Milford
 Mitchelstown
 Newtownshandrum
 Shanballymore

Béara (West Cork) 
 Adrigole
 Bere Island
 Castletownbere
 Garnish
 Glengarriff
 Urhan

Carbery (South West Cork)

Carrigdhoun (South East Cork)

Imokilly (East Cork)

Muskerry (Mid Cork)

Seandún (City Division)

Duhallow (North West Cork) 

 Ballydesmond
 Banteer
 Boherbue
 Castlemagner
 Cullen
 Dromtarriffe
 Freemount
 Glenlara
 Kanturk
 Kilbrin
 Kiskeam
 Knocknagree
 Lismire
 Lyre
 Meelin
 Millstreet
 Newmarket
 Rockchapel
 St. John's
 Tullylease

Kerry

Limerick

City Division

East Division

South Division

West Division

Tipperary

Waterford

Ulster

Antrim

Defunct Antrim clubs
 McCracken's GAC, Ballymena
 St Patrick's GAC, Ballymena
 St Columba's, Greencastle
 Riverdale Rovers, Belfast

Armagh

Defunct Armagh clubs

Cavan

Derry

Donegal

East Division

Inishowen Division

North-West Division

South Division

South-West Division

Down

Fermanagh

Monaghan

Tyrone

Defunct Tyrone clubs

See also
 List of Gaelic Games clubs in Mayo

References

Ireland
Gaelic games